Linzhou, formerly Lin County or Linxian (()), is a county-level city in Anyang, Henan, China. Adjacent to Shanxi Province and Hebei Province, it is located in the north of Henan Province and at the eastern foot of the Taihang Mountains. It covers an area of 2046 square kilometers and has a population of about one million.

Linzhou is well known for its Red Flag Canal, which was constructed in the 1960s.

Administrative divisions
As 2012, this city is divided to 4 subdistricts, 13 towns and 3 townships.
Subdistricts

Towns

Townships
Chadian Township
Chengjiao Township
Shiban Township

Climate

See also
 Linzhou Steel

References

External links
 Government website of Linzhou

 
County-level divisions of Henan
Anyang
Cities in Henan